Demetrida carteri is a species of ground beetle in Lebiinae subfamily. It was described by Sloane in 1923 and is endemic to Australia.

References

Beetles described in 1923
Beetles of Australia
carteri